Caernarfon Airport , formerly RAF Llandwrog, is located  southwest of Caernarfon, Gwynedd, Wales.

Operations
Caernarfon Aerodrome has a CAA Ordinary Licence (Number P866) that allows flights for the public transport of passengers or for flying instruction as authorised by the licensee (Air Caernarfon Limited). The aerodrome is not licensed for night use. The airport has a licensed runway: 07/25, an unlicensed one: 02/20 and a disused runway which formed a triangle layout commonly used during the Second World War.

The airport is mainly used by small fixed-wing aircraft, helicopters and microlights. Several companies based at the airport offer flight training. North Wales Flight Academy offers fixed-wing training for the issue of a PPL (A) and other fixed-wing qualifications. Microlight traffic forms a considerable part of the local aerodrome traffic and flight training is provided by The Microlight School. Helicopter training is also undertaken at the airport by Geo Helicopters. It is also possible to have pleasure flights and charters from the airport. There is also a helicopter simulator located inside the Airworld Aviation Museum.

The airport is also home to one of the three Wales Air Ambulance helicopters.

Facilities
During the 2000s, the airport underwent significant re-development and expansion. At the aerodrome, there is a large café, a maintenance and storage hangar, and a visitor centre and shop which are part of the Aviation Museum at the site.

SAR
In 2013, the UK government handed out the contract to manage search and rescue for the next ten years to Bristow Helicopters, using two Sikorsky S-92 helicopters. Since 1 July 2015, search and rescue operations have commenced at Caernarfon Airport.

See also
 RAF Llandwrog
 Search and rescue

References

External links

 Airports in Wales
 Buildings and structures in Gwynedd
Caernarfon